Gerrodes is a genus of moths of the family Noctuidae.

Species
 Gerrodes longipes Druce, 1889
 Gerrodes minatea Dyar, 1912
 Gerrodes minor Dognin, 1914

External links
 Gerrodes at Markku Savela's Lepidoptera and Some Other Life Forms
 Natural History Museum Lepidoptera genus database

Agaristinae